Dead Man Walking is a 1995 American crime drama film starring Susan Sarandon and Sean Penn, and co-produced and directed by Tim Robbins, who adapted the screenplay from the 1993 non-fiction book of the same name.

Sister Helen Prejean (Sarandon) establishes a special relationship with Matthew Poncelet (Penn), a character based on convicted murderers Elmo Patrick Sonnier and Robert Lee Willie. He is a prisoner on death row in Louisiana, and she visits him as his spiritual adviser after corresponding with him.

The film was a critical and commercial success; it grossed $83 million on a budget of $11 million and received praise for the performances of Penn and Sarandon, as well as Robbins' direction. Sarandon's performance won her the Academy Award for Best Actress, while Robbins, Penn and Bruce Springsteen were nominated for Best Director, Best Actor and Best Original Song, respectively, for the single "Dead Man Walkin'".

Plot
Matthew Poncelet, who was sentenced to death for the murder of a teenage couple, has been on death row at the Louisiana State Penitentiary for six years. He committed his crimes with Carl Vitello, who was sentenced to life imprisonment without parole. As his scheduled execution date approaches, Poncelet asks Sister Helen Prejean, with whom he has corresponded, to help him with a final appeal.

Sister Helen decides to visit Poncelet, who is arrogant, sexist and racist, and does not even pretend to feel remorse. He protests his innocence and insists Vitello killed the two teenagers. Convincing an experienced attorney to take on Poncelet's case pro bono, Sister Helen tries to have his sentence commuted to life imprisonment. After many visits, she establishes a relationship with him. At the same time, she gets to know Poncelet's mother, Lucille, and the families of the two victims. The victims' families do not understand Sister Helen's efforts to help Poncelet and claim that she is "taking his side". They desire "absolute justice" i.e. his life for those of their children.

Sister Helen's application for commutation is refused. Poncelet asks Sister Helen to be his spiritual adviser through his execution, and she agrees. Sister Helen tells Poncelet that his redemption is possible only if he takes responsibility for what he did. Just before he is taken from his cell, Poncelet tearfully admits to Sister Helen that he had killed the boy and raped the girl, before Vitello killed her. As he is prepared for execution, he appeals to the boy's father for forgiveness and tells the girl's parents that he hopes his death brings them peace.

Poncelet is executed by lethal injection and given a proper burial. The murdered boy's father attends the funeral ceremony; although he is still filled with hate, he soon begins to pray with Sister Helen.

Cast

 Susan Sarandon as Sister Helen Prejean
 Sean Penn as Matthew Poncelet
 Robert Prosky as Hilton Barber
 Raymond J. Barry as Earl Delacroix
 R. Lee Ermey as Clyde Percy
 Celia Weston as Mary Beth Percy
 Lois Smith as Augusta Bourg Prejean
 Scott Wilson as Chaplain Farley
 Roberta Maxwell as Lucille Poncelet
 Margo Martindale as Sister Colleen
 Kevin Cooney as Governor Benedict
 Clancy Brown as State Trooper
 Michael Cullen as Carl Vitello
 Peter Sarsgaard as Walter Delacroix
 Missy Yager as Hope Percy
 Jack Black as Craig Poncelet
 Barton Heyman as Captain Beliveau
 Nesbitt Blaisdell as Warden Hartman
 Steve Boles as Sergeant Neal Trapp
 Shannon Proctor as Assistant to Governor Benedict

Soundtrack

Reception

Critical response
Dead Man Walking was well received by critics. Rotten Tomatoes gives it a 95% positive rating based on reviews from 60 critics, with an average rating of 8.24/10. The site's consensus states: "A powerful, thought-provoking film that covers different angles of its topic without resorting to preaching, Dead Man Walking will cause the viewer to reflect regardless of their political viewpoint." Metacritic gives it a rating of 80/100 based on reviews from 26 critics, indicating "Generally favorable reviews."

Hal Hinson of The Washington Post commented: "What this intelligent, balanced, devastating movie puts before us is nothing less than a contest between good and evil." Kenneth Turan of the Los Angeles Times described the acting: "For this kind of straight-ahead movie to work, the acting must be strong without even a breath of theatricality, and in Penn and Sarandon, Dead Man Walking has performers capable of making that happen." Roger Ebert of the Chicago Sun-Times gave the film four stars, his highest rating, and called it "absorbing, surprising, technically superb and worth talking about for a long time afterward."

Accolades

Tim Robbins dedicated the movie to his paternal grandfather, Lee Robbins, and maternal grandmother, Thelma Bledsoe, in gratitude for his college tuition.

The real-life Helen Prejean can be seen briefly in the candlelight vigil scene outside the prison protesting the death penalty with the rest of the cast.

Box office
Dead Man Walking debuted on December 29, 1995, in the United States. With a budget of $11 million, the film grossed $39,387,284 domestically and $43,701,011 internationally, for a total of $83,088,295 worldwide.

Other versions
In 2002, Tim Robbins, who adapted the book for the film, also wrote a stage version of Dead Man Walking. It has also been adapted as an opera by the same name, premiering in San Francisco.

Legacy
Yvonne Koslovsky-Golan, author of The Death Penalty in American Cinema: Criminality and Retribution in Hollywood Film, stated that even though public debate on the death penalty increased for a period after the release of Dead Man Walking, the film did not result in "real political or legal change" but encouraged additional academic study on the death penalty.

References

External links

 
 
 
 
 Dead Man Walking at the Arts & Faith Top100 Spiritually Significant Films list

1995 films
1995 crime drama films
1990s American films
1990s English-language films
1990s legal films
American crime drama films
American legal drama films
American prison films
Films about capital punishment
Films about Catholic nuns
Films about Christianity
Films based on non-fiction books
Films directed by Tim Robbins
Films featuring a Best Actress Academy Award-winning performance
Films produced by Jon Kilik
Films set in Louisiana
Films shot in New Orleans
Gramercy Pictures films
PolyGram Filmed Entertainment films
Working Title Films films